World Soccer is an English-language football magazine, published by Kelsey Media. The magazine was established in 1960 and is the oldest continually published football magazine in the United Kingdom. It specialises in the international football scene. Its regular contributing writers include Brian Glanville, Keir Radnedge, Sid Lowe and Tim Vickery. World Soccer is a member of the European Sports Magazines (ESM), an umbrella group of similar magazines printed in other languages. The members of this group elect a European "Team of the Month" and a European "Team of the Year".

Since 1982, World Soccer has also organised "Player of the Year", "Manager of the Year" and "Team of the Year" awards.

History
The magazine was first published in London in October 1960, by Echo Publications. The first edition featured an image of Titus Buberník and Svatopluk Pluskal on the front cover. It was edited by Robert Bolle, with Graham Payne, editor of weekly sister publication Soccer Star, as features editor; Jack Rollin, who later edited The Football Yearbook for many years, as home editor; and Eric Batty as overseas editor. Batty, who later edited the magazine, published an annual World XI from 1960 to 1992. Brian Glanville has written a column for the magazine since April 1963. In 1970, Soccer Star, which was first published on 20 September 1952 as Raich Carter's Soccer Star, was incorporated into World Soccer. Keir Radnedge, who had been associate editor, took over from Philip Rising as editor in the late 1980s and was replaced by deputy editor Gavin Hamilton in January 1998 and became executive editor. Radnedge continues to have a monthly column in the magazine.

TI Media (formerly IPC Magazines, IPC Media and Time Inc. UK) published the magazine until the May 2020 issue with Kelsey Media taking over the following issue after they acquired the title from Future plc, the successor of TI Media. Hamilton, who had worked for World Soccer for 26 years, stepped down as editor after publishing the 60th anniversary edition in June 2020.

Other regular contributors have included Paul Gardner, with a focus on football in the United States; David Conn; Jonathan Wilson; Mark Gleeson on African football; Tim Vickery, Brian Homewood and Eric Weil on South American football.

Award winners

Men's World Player of the Year

All-time wins

By player

By country

By League

Young Player of the Year

Men's World Manager of the Year

All-time wins

By manager

By country

Men's World Team of the Year

By team

Women's World Player of the Year
 2020 – , Wolfsburg and Chelsea
 2021 – , Barcelona
 2022 – , Arsenal

Women's World Manager of the Year
 2020 – , Lyon
 2021 – , Barcelona
 2022 – , England

Women's World Team of the Year
 2020 – 
 2021 – 
 2022 –

Referee of the Year
Source:

Greatest XI of All Time
The list is based on the voting poll consisted of 74 experts (journalists, TV pundits, current and former players and managers) from around the world.

(Published July 2013)

Goalkeepers

Full backs

Central defenders

Midfielders

Strikers

Greatest Managers of All Time 

The list is based on the voting poll consisting of 74 experts (journalists, TV pundits, current and former players and managers) from around the world with each having been allotted 5 managerial picks.

(Published July 2013)

Key
Managers in bold are ranked by World Soccer, France Football and ESPN

Greatest Players of the 20th century

In the December 1999 issue, a readers' poll listing the 100 greatest football players of the 20th century was published.

World Player of the Decade 2000 to 2009
In 2009, a World Player of the Decade was announced based on the reader's votes from 2000 to 2009 in the annual Player of the Year polls.

Eric Batty's World XI
Since the first year of publication of World Soccer and over a 30-year period, overseas editor Eric Batty published his team selection of the best players over the season.

By player

See also
FIFA World Cup All-Time Team
FIFA World Cup Dream Team
FIFA 100
FIFA Player of the Century
World Team of the 20th Century
ESM Team of the Season

References

External links
 The online edition of World Soccer Magazine

1960 establishments in England
Association football magazines
Football mass media in the United Kingdom
Magazines established in 1960
Monthly magazines published in the United Kingdom
Sports magazines published in the United Kingdom